Martin Davis (Marty) Kinack is a Canadian record producer and sound technician. He is most noted for his work with Broken Social Scene, Hayden and Sarah Harmer.

Career
Kinack was a member of the band Transistor Sound & Lighting Co., who released a self-titled album on ViK. Recordings in 1998. 

Kinack toured with Sarah Harmer in 2001, playing guitar and organ. In 2004, working in a studio set up in Harmer's home near Kingston, he co-produced and performed on her album All of Our Names. He was the producer of a number of releases by the band Apostles of Hustle.

Kinack began touring as sound engineer with Broken Social Scene in 2003. He later worked as producer for many of the band's recordings. He later produced an album for the Toronto band The Beauties.
 
In 2015 Kinack was a member of Laser, an electro-pop trio with Lisa Lobsinger and Paul Pfisterer. Their debut album, "Night Driver" was released in early 2016.

References

Canadian record producers
Musicians from Toronto
Living people
Broken Social Scene members
Canadian indie rock musicians
Year of birth missing (living people)